Dinah Eckerle (born 16 October 1995) is a German handballer for Team Esbjerg and the German national team.

Achievements
Handball-Bundesliga:
Winner: 2012, 2013, 2014, 2015, 2016, 2018
DHB-Pokal:
Winner: 2013
DHB-Supercup:
Winner: 2015, 2016

Individual awards  
All-Star Goalkeeper of the IHF Junior World Championship: 2014

References

External links

1995 births
Living people
People from Leonberg
Sportspeople from Stuttgart (region)
German female handball players
Expatriate handball players
German expatriate sportspeople in France
German expatriate sportspeople in Hungary
Siófok KC players
21st-century German women